Daewoong Pharmaceutical Co., Ltd (Korean: 대웅제약) is a Seoul, South Korea-based bioengineering company operating as a subsidiary of Daewoong Co., Ltd., a global health care group. Daewoong Pharmaceutical primarily engages in the manufacture of pharmaceutical products in South Korea, including prescription and over-the-counter healthcare products.

History

References

External links
Official site

Pharmaceutical companies of South Korea
Manufacturing companies based in Seoul
Companies listed on the Korea Exchange
Pharmaceutical companies established in 1942
1942 establishments in Korea